Yael Cohen Braun ( Cohen; born 4 November 1986) is a South African-Canadian businesswoman, and a co-founder of Fuck Cancer, a health organization working for early detection and prevention of cancer.

Early life 
Yael Cohen was born in South Africa to a Jewish family. Her father, David Cohen, worked as an oil and mining entrepreneur at Gold Wheaton Gold Corp, Northern Orion Resources and two other natural-resource companies. The family moved to Canada in 1994. She attended the University of British Columbia where she received a B.A. in Political Science in 2008. After graduation, she went on to work in finance.

Career 
Cohen Braun launched Fuck Cancer in 2009 after her mother was diagnosed with breast cancer. Fuck Cancer aims to engage millennials through social media to have a conversation about early detection and acute awareness of cancer. In 2016, Fuck Cancer collaborated with jewelry designer Jennifer Fisher on fashion wearables in support of cancer victims.

In 2018, Cohen Braun joined Bumble as a senior advisor.

Politics 
Cohen Braun has financially supported the presidential and senate campaigns of Cory Booker. Cohen Braun and her then-husband Scooter Braun held a fundraiser for Kamala Harris during the 2020 Democratic primaries.

Personal life 
Cohen Braun married American music manager Scooter Braun on 6 July 2014 in Whistler, British Columbia. They have three children. In July 2021, it was reported that the couple had separated. Braun filed for divorce on 21 July 2021.

Awards 
 2011 The Globe and Mail'''s 12 people who are transforming philanthropy
 2012 Fast Company magazine's 100 Most Creative People in Business
 Women's Executive Network 100 Most Powerful Women in Canada
 Marketing magazine's Thirty Under 30
 Business In Vancouver Forty under 40
 Oprah's SuperSoul 100 Queen Elizabeth II Diamond Jubilee Medal

 References 

 External links 

 Teen Vogue: "Giving Back: Yael Cohen's Mission to Promote Early Cancer Detection"
 Yael Cohen Braun Video produced by Makers: Women Who Make America''

Businesspeople from Vancouver
Canadian health activists
Cancer awareness
Jewish Canadian philanthropists
Living people
South African emigrants to Canada
South African Jews
University of British Columbia alumni
Canadian women company founders
1986 births
21st-century Canadian businesswomen
21st-century Canadian businesspeople